The Heart of Nora Flynn is a 1916 American silent drama film directed by Cecil B. DeMille. The film is reportedly preserved at George Eastman House Motion Picture Collection.

Cast

See also
The House That Shadows Built (1931 promotional film by Paramount)

References

External links

1916 films
1916 drama films
Silent American drama films
American silent feature films
American black-and-white films
Films directed by Cecil B. DeMille
1910s American films
1910s English-language films